In phonetics, nasalization (or nasalisation) is the production of a sound while the velum is lowered, so that some air escapes through the nose during the production of the sound by the mouth.

A subscript diacritic , called an ogonek or nosinė, is sometimes seen, especially when the vowel bears tone marks that would interfere with the superscript tilde.

Nasal vowels

Many languages have nasal vowels to different degrees, but only a minority of world languages around the world have nasal vowels as contrasting phonemes. That is the case, among others, of French, Portuguese, Hindustani, Nepali, Breton, Gheg Albanian, Hmong, Hokkien, Yoruba, and Cherokee. Those nasal vowels contrast with their corresponding oral vowels. Nasality is usually seen as a binary feature, although surface variation in different degrees of nasality caused by neighboring nasal consonants has been observed.

Degree of nasality
There are occasional languages, such as in Palantla Chinantec, where vowels seem to exhibit three contrastive degrees of nasality: oral e.g.  vs lightly nasalized  vs heavily nasalized , although Ladefoged and Maddieson believe that the lightly nasalized vowels are best described as oro-nasal diphthongs. Note that Ladefoged and Maddieson's transcription of heavy nasalization with a double tilde might be confused with the extIPA adoption of that diacritic for velopharyngeal frication.

Nasal consonants

Most nasal consonants are occlusives, and airflow through the mouth is blocked and redirected through the nose. Their oral counterparts are the stops.

Nasalized consonants
Nasalized versions of other consonant sounds also exist but are much rarer than either nasal occlusives or nasal vowels. It seems likely that it was once a nasalized fricative, perhaps a palatal .

In Coatzospan Mixtec, fricatives and affricates are nasalized before nasal vowels even when they are voiceless. In the Hupa, the velar nasal  often has the tongue not make full contact, resulting in a nasalized approximant, . That is cognate with a nasalized palatal approximant  in other Athabaskan languages.

In Umbundu, phonemic  contrasts with the (allophonically) nasalized approximant  and so is likely to be a true fricative rather than an approximant. In Old and Middle Irish, the lenited  was a nasalized bilabial fricative.

Sundanese has an allophonic nasalized glottal stop ; nasalized stops can occur only with pharyngeal articulation or lower, or they would be simple nasals. Nasal flaps are common allophonically. Many West African languages have a nasal flap  (or ) as an allophone of  before a nasal vowel; Pashto, however, has a phonemic nasal retroflex lateral flap.

Other languages, such as the Khoisan languages of Khoekhoe and Gǀui, as well as several of the !Kung languages, include nasal click consonants. Often when  is nasalized, it becomes .

True nasal fricatives

Besides nasalized oral fricatives, there are true nasal fricatives, or anterior nasal fricatives, previously called nareal fricatives. They are sometimes produced by people with disordered speech. The turbulence in the airflow characteristic of fricatives is produced not in the mouth but at the anterior nasal port, the narrowest part of the nasal cavity. (Turbulence can also be produced at the posterior nasal port, or velopharyngeal port, when that port is narrowed – see velopharyngeal fricative. With anterior nasal fricatives, the velopharyngeal port is open.) No known language makes use of nasal fricatives in non-disordered speech.

Denasalization

Nasalization may be lost over time. There are also denasal sounds, which sound like nasals spoken with a head cold. They may be found in non-pathological speech as a language loses nasal consonants, as in Korean.

Contextual nasalization

Vowels assimilate to surrounding nasal consonants in many languages, such as Thai, creating nasal vowel allophones. Some languages exhibit a nasalization of segments adjacent to phonemic or allophonic nasal vowels, such as Apurinã.

Contextual nasalization can lead to the addition of nasal vowel phonemes to a language. That happened in French, most of whose final consonants disappeared, but its final nasals made the preceding vowels become nasal, which introduced a new distinction into the language. An example is vin blanc  ('white wine'), ultimately from Latin vinum and blancum.

See also
Eclipsis, a similar process in Gaelic that is often called "nasalization"
Nasal consonant
Nasal release
Nasal vowel
Nasality
Prenasalized consonant

References

 
Phonetics
Phonology
Historical linguistics
Assimilation (linguistics)